Veľké Dravce is a village and municipality in the Lučenec District in the Banská Bystrica Region of Slovakia.

Notable people
Květa Fialová (1929–2017), actress

External links
https://web.archive.org/web/20070513023228/http://www.statistics.sk/mosmis/eng/run.html

Villages and municipalities in Lučenec District